Saša Cilinšek (Serbian Cyrillic: Саша Цилиншек; born 28 January 1982) is a Serbian football player.

Personal life
Born in Vrdnik (SR Serbia, SFR Yugoslavia), he is the older brother Zoran Cilinšek.  Saša started his career in local FK Rudar Vrdnik where he played between 1989 and 1995 when he moved to the youth team of FK Vojvodina.  In 1998, he became senior and he made his debut in the First League of FR Yugoslavia.

At national team level, he played for all youth selection including FR Yugoslavia U-21.

References

External sources
 Profile at Srbijafudbal

1982 births
Living people
Serbian footballers
Serbian expatriate footballers
Association football defenders
FK Vojvodina players
SC Tavriya Simferopol players
FK Ventspils players
FK Jagodina players
Red Star Belgrade footballers
Serbian SuperLiga players
Thonon Evian Grand Genève F.C. players
Ligue 2 players
Ligue 1 players
Ukrainian Premier League players
Expatriate footballers in Poland
Expatriate footballers in Ukraine
Expatriate footballers in Latvia
Expatriate footballers in France
Serbian expatriate sportspeople in Latvia
Serbian expatriate sportspeople in Poland
Serbia and Montenegro under-21 international footballers